The Treaty of London, signed on 18 August O.S. (28 August N.S.) 1604, concluded the nineteen-year Anglo-Spanish War. The treaty restored the status quo between the two nations. The negotiations probably took place at Somerset House in Westminster and are sometimes known as the Somerset House Conference.

Background
The Anglo-Spanish War had been a complex and fluctuating conflict that also had connections with the Dutch Revolt, the French Wars of Religion, and the Nine Years' War in Ireland. The war by 1600 had been going on for nearly fifteen years with neither side gaining an overall benefit or a decisive advantage. The exhaustion of Spain, the rebellious opposition to the King's request for money, the mutinies of the troops in the Netherlands, and the fear of a renewal of a new war with France over the Duchy of Saluzzo all combined to emphasise the hopelessness of inflicting a vital blow on England.

Early peace proposals
In April 1600, Archduke Albert, the governor of the Spanish Netherlands, opened secret negotiations with England for a settlement but did not inform Madrid. The following month, negotiations culminated in a meeting of a conference at Boulogne between representatives of Spain, England and Burgundy. Spain demanded the cession of the Cautionary Towns. England demanded free trade with Spain and her empire, freedom of English subjects from the inquisition and the exclusive right of having warships in the channel. The talks got nowhere, Spain contended that it was absurd to expect the sovereign of a worldwide empire to give the pas to a queen of a few islands. By August the talks were off –
mutual distrust and United Provinces pressure made any agreement impossible. Despite this however diplomatic routes were open between England, Albert, and his wife, Isabella Clara Eugenia (Philip's sister). Letters from representatives showed that Albert, Isabella Clara Eugenia, and Philip were still anxious for peace despite their difference in policies. Philip wanted to preserve the hegemony of the Spanish empire, whilst the Archduke and Isabella sought peace and friendly relations.

After the death of Queen Elizabeth I in 1603, her successor, James I, quickly sought to end the long and draining conflict. By this time Spanish hopes of a decisive military victory in the Netherlands, or a successful invasion of England, were relatively remote. James was an idealistic practitioner of Christian peace and unity and also the son and successor to Mary, Queen of Scots, whose execution had been a proximate cause of the conflict. Philip III of Spain had also inherited the war from his predecessor, Philip II, and his treasuries had also been drained and so he warmly welcomed the offer and ordered the commencement of the difficult negotiations that followed.

The concern of the government in Madrid was to improve their dire military situation in the Netherlands by reducing or stopping English help to the Dutch rebels. Meanwhile, Johan van Oldenbarnevelt, heading the delegation of the States of Holland, tried to attract the complicity of the new English monarch in the conflict in Flanders, of which the focus was the Siege of Ostend. The siege had become a struggle of bloody attrition after just over two years.

The first moves towards peace were taken in June 1603, when Juan de Tassis headed a Spanish–Flemish Commission which visited London, seeking truces and mutual good faith. Tassis was despatched to England by Philip III of Spain to explore the possibilities for a settlement following Elizabeth's death.

Archduke Albert had already sent his envoy Charles de Ligne, prince-count of Arenberg, to London and was joined by Juan de Tassis, in September 1603. Although De Tassis lacked full negotiating powers he was active behind the scene the following month in preparation for a settlement.

Treaty
At the end of 1603, the constable of Castile arrived in Brussels with the authorisation to conclude the treaty if one could be negotiated. On 19 May 1604, with the constable still waiting in the wings, the rest of the Habsburg delegation arrived in London and the English negotiating team was appointed.

English delegation
 Robert Cecil, 1st Earl of Salisbury (1563–1612), Secretary of State, James I's leading minister
 Charles Blount, 1st Earl of Devonshire (1563–1606), soldier
 Thomas Sackville, 1st Earl of Dorset (1536–1608), Lord Treasurer
 Henry Howard, 1st Earl of Northampton (1540–1614), Lord Warden of the Cinque Ports
 Charles Howard, 1st Earl of Nottingham (1536–1624), Lord High Admiral

Spanish delegations
The Spanish negotiated with two delegations, one representing the King of Spain, the other the Archdukes Albert and Isabella, rulers of the Spanish Netherlands.

Spanish delegation:
 Juan Fernández de Velasco, 5th Duke of Frías, Constable of Castile
 Juan de Tassis, 1st Count of Villamediana
 Alessandro Robida, Senator of Milan

Delegation of the Spanish Netherlands:
 Charles de Ligne, 2nd Prince of Arenberg
 Jean Richardot, President of the Brussels Privy Council
 Louis Verreyken, Audiencier of Brussels

Terms
 Spain recognizes the Protestant monarchy of England and renounces intentions to restore the Church of Rome in the country. 
 An end to Spanish military intervention in Ireland.
 An end to English disruption to Spanish trans-Atlantic shipping and colonial expansion (article 6).
 The English Channel opened to Spanish shipping.
 An end to English intervention in the Dutch Revolt (articles 4,5,7); England withdraws military and financial support to the Dutch rebels.
 Ships of both countries, merchants or warships, could use the mainland seaports of the other party for refit, shelter or buy provisions (article 10). Fleets of less than eight ships did not even have to ask for permission, which provided an extensive network of naval bases for the Spaniards in England to help their war against the Protestant Dutch.

The treaty restored the status quo ante bellum. It amounted to an acknowledgement by Spain that its hopes of restoring Roman Catholicism in England were at an end and it had to recognise the Protestant monarchy in England. In return, England ended its financial and military support for the Dutch rebellion, ongoing since the Treaty of Nonsuch (1585), and had to end its wartime disruption of Spanish trans-Atlantic shipping and colonial expansion.

Aftermath
With England out of the way, the Spanish hoped for a knock-out blow that would force the Dutch into a peace by launching a huge campaign led by Ambrogio Spinola in 1606. James still allowed the Dutch army to recruit English volunteer soldiers in their service – 8,000 having served in the Netherlands in 1605. In addition, English corsairs were now finding their needs in the service of the Dutch, who preyed on Spanish shipping.  Conversely, Spanish warships and privateers were allowed to use English ports as naval bases to attack Dutch shipping or to transport reinforcements to Flanders. In November 1607, the costs of the recent wars with France, the Protestant Dutch as well as England resulted in Spain's bankruptcy. The Twelve Years' Truce was thus signed, which formally recognized the independence of the Dutch Republic.

To the English public, the treaty was highly unpopular, viewing it as a "humiliating peace". They felt that the King had deserted their ally the Netherlands in order to appease the Spanish, and it made James I "monumentally unpopular". Noel Caron, ambassador of the United Provinces to London, wrote that "no promulgation was ever received in London with more coolness, yes—with more sadness." As such no public celebrations were held in England after the conclusion of the agreement. The rift between James I's foreign policy and public opinion would widen some years later as a result of the "Spanish Match", when the Protestant House of Commons would confront the King over his marriage arrangement between Maria Anna of Spain, the daughter of Philip III of Spain and James's son Charles, the Prince of Wales. The English delegation, however, considered the treaty with Spain a diplomatic victory which gave the English "peace with honour". Gold and silver medals designed by Nicholas Hilliard were struck to commemorate the peace.

The peace agreement was well received in Spain. There were big public celebrations in the Spanish capital Valladolid from April to June 1605 in honour of the treaty and of the birth of Philip's son Philip IV of Spain. Also present were the English ambassadorial delegation (which numbered 500) led by Lord Admiral Charles Howard. He had been sent by James I in return for Don Juan de Velasco having been sent to England to negotiate the peace the previous year. The English delegation were welcomed with a warm reception and honours on 26 May which included Howard being received at the English college. The treaty was then ratified in the Royal Palace of Valladolid in the presence of Howard the following month. Some voices from the Catholic Church, however, expressed its concern to Philip III over his settlement with a "heretical power", especially Juan de Ribera, then bishop of Valencia who protested. Once the agreement was concluded, Philip III appointed Don Pedro de Zuñiga as first Spanish resident ambassador to England.

For the Spanish crown, there was hope after the peace treaty that England would eventually secure tolerance for Catholics. The Gunpowder Plot in 1605, however, destroyed any possibility of this. Protestant fears that a peace with Spain would ultimately mean an invasion by Jesuits and Catholic sympathisers over the coming years also failed to materialise as the Elizabethan Recusancy laws were rigidly enforced by Parliament.

Following the signing of the treaty, England and Spain remained at peace until 1625.

References

Sources
 
 Davenport, Frances Gardiner; & Paullin, Charles Oscar. European Treaties Bearing on the History of the United States and Its Dependencies, The Lawbook Exchange, Ltd., 2004 ,

External links
 Text of the Treaty in Latin and English (main body incomplete only clauses 1,2,9. 
 Text of the Treaty in English (complete)
 Text of the Treaty in Latin and Spanish (complete)

See also
 List of treaties

1604 in England
London (1604)
17th century in London
Anglo-Spanish War (1585–1604)
1604 treaties
London (1604)
Treaties of Ireland